Jeffry Life (born in July 1938) is a physician and author from the United States, known for maintaining a youthful body in old age.

Early career
Life began his career as a resident at West Virginia University, focusing on family medicine and internal medicine. He continued his career as a full-time family physician while also serving as a part-time Assistant Professor at Marywood University in Pennsylvania. He taught graduate courses in nutritional science and exercise physiology.

Current
Life is Director of Medical Services for The Life Center for Healthy Aging in Charleston, WV.

Books
Life's first book, The Life Plan, was released in 2011 and became a New York Times Best Seller. He followed it with Mastering The Life Plan in 2013, and his third book, The Life Plan Diet, in 2014.

Television
Life has appeared on The Dr. Phil Show, Inside Edition, The Doctors, The Steve Harvey Show, Anderson Cooper's AC 360, as well as other shows.

Education and credentials
MD, University of Iowa. Residency, West Virginia University. PhD, The University of Michigan (environmental sciences and health).

Life is board-certified in family medicine.

References

1938 births
Living people
American male writers
American physicians
University of Iowa alumni
University of Michigan alumni
Family physicians